Humberto Gabriel Hernández López (born 20 July 1985) is a Mexican professional footballer currently playing for Atlante in Liga de Expansión MX. He is nicknamed Gansito (diminutive of Goose in Spanish) because of his appearance.
He is the son of former goalkeeper Gabriel "Tibiri" Hernández Zamudio.

Honours
Atlante
Liga de Expansión MX: Apertura 2021, Apertura 2022
Campeón de Campeones: 2022

Individual
Liga de Expansión MX Balón de Oro: 2021–22

References

External links

 Ascenso MX Profile

1985 births
Living people
Mexican footballers
C.F. Pachuca players
Indios de Ciudad Juárez footballers
Dorados de Sinaloa footballers
Leones Negros UdeG footballers
Tampico Madero F.C. footballers
Liga MX players
Association football goalkeepers
People from Nezahualcóyotl